B42 may refer to:
 The Gutenberg Bible or the "42-line Bible"
 Bundesstraße 42, a German road
 B42 (New York City bus) in Brooklyn
 HLA-B42, an HLA-B serotype
 B-42 Mixmaster, an American aircraft